Breunig is a surname. Notable people with the surname include:

Bob Breunig (born 1953), American football linebacker
Johann Adam Breunig (1660–1727), German Baroque architect
Louis Breunig (born 2003), German footballer
 Martin Breunig (born 1992), German basketball player
Max Breunig (1888–1961), German footballer
Maximilian Breunig (born 2000), German footballer